Makhanaha may refer to:

Makhanaha, Janakpur, Nepal
Makhanaha, Sagarmatha, Nepal